Udaynarayanpur Assembly constituency is an assembly constituency in Howrah district in the Indian state of West Bengal.

Overview
As per orders of the Delimitation Commission, No. 182 Udaynarayanpur Assembly constituency  is composed of the following: Udaynarayanpur community development block, and Anulia, Balichak, Basantapur, Kanpur and Khosalpur gram panchayats of Amta I community development block.

Udaynarayanpur Assembly constituency is part of No. 26 Uluberia (Lok Sabha constituency).

Members of Legislative Assembly

Election results

2021

2016

2011

 

.# Swing calculated on Congress+Trinamool Congress vote percentages taken together in 2006.

1977-2006
In the 2006 state assembly elections, Chandralekha Bag of CPI(M) won the Udaynarayanpur seat defeating her nearest rival Samir Kumar Panja of Trinamool Congress. Contests in most years were multi cornered but only winners and runners are being mentioned. Nani Gopal Chowdhury of CPI(M) defeated Sukhendu Sekhar Roy of Trinamool Congress in 2001 and Shyamal Ranjan Karar of Congress in 1996. Pannalal Maji of CPI(M) defeated Saroj Ranjan Karar of Congress in 1991, 1987, 1982 and 1977.

1962-1977
Saroj Karar of Congress won in 1972. Pannalal Maji of CPI(M) won in 1971, 1969 and 1967. Arabinda Roy of Congress won in 1962. Prior to that the Udaynarayanpur seat did not exist.

References

Assembly constituencies of West Bengal
Politics of Howrah district
1962 establishments in West Bengal
Constituencies established in 1962